Lilian Garcia-Roig (born 1966) is a Cuban-born, American painter based in Florida. She is mostly known for her large-scale painting installations of densely forested landscapes.  Currently, she is a professor of art at Florida State University.

Exhibitions 
Recent notable exhibitions include The Florida Prize Exhibition at Orlando Museum of Art in 2019; Relational Undercurrents: Contemporary Art of the Caribbean Archipelago, curated by Tatiana Flores, Museum of Latin American Art (MOLAA); Long Beach, California. The exhibition is part of the Getty's Pacific Standard Time Initiative and will be featured at MOLAA from September 16, 2017, through January 2018, which traveled to the Wallach Art Gallery, Columbia University, New York City, during Summer 2018; The Patricia & Philip Frost Art Museum, Florida International University, Miami, Fall 2018; Portland Museum of Art, Portland, Maine, Spring 2019; and the Delaware Art Museum, Wilmington, Delaware, Summer 2019.
Garcia-Roig has shown nationally at the National Museum of Women in the Arts and the Art Museum of the Americas both in Washington, D.C. and extensively in the south, especially in Texas and Florida. Internationally, she has shown at the Chopo Museum in Mexico City and Byblos Art Gallery in Verona, Italy.

Early Career and Education 
Lilian Garcia-Roig was born in Havana, Cuba in 1966. She was raised in Houston, Texas and attended Southern Methodist University on a Meadows Fine Arts scholarship. In 1990, she received her M.F.A. from the University of Pennsylvania with the Charles Addams Memorial Prize in Fine Art for most outstanding graduate student. In addition, she studied at the Skowhegan School of Painting and Sculpture during the summer of 1990.  Garcia-Roig then joined the faculty at the University of Texas at Austin, rising to tenured associate professor by 1996. She won multiple awards, including a Kimbrough Award for outstanding Texas artist under 30 in 1992, a Mid-America Arts Alliance NEA in Painting in 1994, and an Artist-in-Residence Fellowship at the Vermont Studio Center.

Later career 
In 1999, Garcia-Roig took a two-year leave from UT Austin and became a visiting associate professor at UC Berkeley.
During the summer of 1999, Garcia-Roig traveled back to Havana, Cuba, as a visiting artist of the Ludwig Foundation of Cuba, where she began to develop work surrounding her Cuban-American identity. In 2001, Garcia-Roig joined the faculty at Florida State University, was appointed the director of graduate studies in 2002, promoted to tenured full professor in 2007, and department chair in 2020.

Style and Themes
Her dense landscapes, painted on site, test the viewer's perception with an impasto application of paint and buildup of surface. Garcia-Roig's painting process involves day-long sessions that culminate in a wet-on-wet rendering of the ever-changing light in a specific location to capture a sense of time. Through this approach, Garcia-Roig engages with the tradition of plein-air painting while considering the notions of place, heritage, and Cuban-American identity. Her painting process balances the physical qualities of paint while exploring the possibilities of landscape as a source for abstraction and confusion.

Awards and Residencies 
Major awards include the Guggenheim Fellowship in 2021, a Joan Mitchell Foundation Award in Painting 2006, a Mid-America Arts Alliance/NEA Fellowship Award in Painting, State of Florida Individual Artist Fellowship Award in painting & a Kimbrough Award from the Dallas Museum of Art. Residencies include a Joan Mitchell Center in New Orleans, Skowhegan School of Painting & Sculpture Fellowship, Vermont Studio Center Artists Fellowship, MacDowell (artists' residency and workshop) Milton & Sally Avery Fellowship, Hambidge Fellow and as a visiting artist at the Ludwig Foundation in Havana, Cuba.

Collections 
Garcia-Roig's works are in the permanent museum collections of:

 Perez Art Museum Miami, FL
 Martin Museum of Art, Waco, TX
 El Paso Museum of Art, TX
 The Grace Museum, TX
 Tyler Museum of Art, TX
 Polk Museum, Lakeland, FL
 Mexic-Arte Museum, Austin, TX
 International Museum of Art & Science, McAllen, TX
 Austin Museum of Art, TX
 San Angelo Museum of Art, TX
 Art Museum of South Texas, Corpus Christi, TX
 Blanton Museum of Art, Austin, TX
 Arizona State University Art Museum, Tempe, AZ
 Huntsville Museum of Art, Huntsville AL

References

Further reading 
 Relational Undercurrents: Contemporary Art of the Caribbean Archipelago, ed. Tatiana Flores and Michelle Stephens, Duke Univ. Press, 2017

External links 
 

Living people
1966 births
University of Pennsylvania alumni
Skowhegan School of Painting and Sculpture alumni
Southern Methodist University alumni
University of Texas at Austin faculty
Florida State University faculty